Idols South Africa VII was the seventh season of South African reality interactive talent show based on the British talent show Pop Idol. It premiered on 5 June 2011.
The judges returned with the addition of Unathi Msengana in the place of Mara Louw and were supported by a guest judge in every casting city.

After the auditions, call backs were held in Sun City for the golden ticket holders. After the theater, group and special guest The Parlotones rounds the final number of contestants were brought down to 16.

Regional auditions 
Auditions began February 2011, and were held in the following cities:

Wooden Mic

Every season the worst auditions voted for by the viewers to be part of their own Top 10 for the Wooden Mic trophy.

Wooden Mic Top 10

Top 16

After the Parlotones performance the judges let 14 contestants know that they were through to the Top 15. With the last two contestants Josslynn Hlenti from Durban and Kerry Sanssoucie from Johannesburg left the judges let the public vote for who they wanted to see in the Top 15.
The following week the results were revealed and Kerry was chosen to take up the last place in the Top 15.

Top 15

The Top 15 contestants performed a song of their own choice. The show air on 24 July 2011 and viewers had the week to vote for their Top 10.

Finals

Finalists
(ages stated at time of contest)

Top 10 – Radio Chart Toppers
The Top 10 performance was recorded live on Friday 5 August 2011 at the Mosaïek Teatro in Fairlands, Johannesburg and aired on Sunday 7 August 2011. 
The results show was aired live on Tuesday 9 August 2011. With guest acts from Idols season 6's third place Sindi Nene and The Black Hotels.

Guest Judge: Ziyon (Liqiudeep)

Top 9 – Homegrew
The Top 9 performance was recorded live on Friday 12 August 2011 at the Mosaïek Teatro in Fairlands, Johannesburg and aired on Sunday 14 August 2011. 
The results show was aired live on Tuesday 16 August 2011. Guest Judge Cofield Mundi performed during the results show and sang a song she specially composed for Idols.

Guest Judge: Cofield Mundi

Top 8 – R’n’B in All Its Diversity
The Top 8 were mentored in the finer points of R’n’B by South African legend Loyiso Bala, who performed with them as a special guest artist.
The Top 8 performance was recorded live on Friday 19 August 2011 at the Mosaïek Teatro in Fairlands, Johannesburg and aired on Sunday 21 August 2011. 
The results show was aired live on Tuesday 23 August 2011.

Guest Performer: Loyiso Bala

Top 8 – Mzansi Youth Choir
The Top 8 took to the stage again after Kelly was saved by the judges. The Top 8 got a little help from the Mzansi Youth Choir, who provided the backing vocals for the Idols. James Blunt also performed during the show.
The Top 8 performance was recorded live on Friday 19 August 2011 at the Mosaïek Teatro in Fairlands, Johannesburg and aired on Sunday 21 August 2011. 
The results show was aired live on Tuesday 23 August 2011. 
Two Contestants were eliminated, due to the judges using there one safe vote the week before.

Backing Vocals: Mzansi Youth Choir 
Guest Performer: James Blunt 
Guest Judge: Chante Moore

Top 6 – Showstopper!
The Top 6 will take to the stage after Erin and Dene was voted off the previous week in a double elimination. 
The Top 6 performance will be recorded live on Friday 2 September 2011 at the Mosaïek Teatro in Fairlands, Johannesburg and aired on Sunday 4 September 2011. 
The results show will be aired live on Tuesday 6 September 2011.

Guest Judge: LeAnne

Top 5 – Rock
Every Contastant will perform two songs. 
The Top 5 performance will be recorded live on Friday 9 September 2011 at the Mosaïek Teatro in Fairlands, Johannesburg and aired on Sunday 11 September 2011. 
The results show will be aired live on Tuesday 13 September 2011.

Guest Judge: Locnville

Top 4 – Grammy-Nominated songs 
Every Contastant will perform two songs. And there will be two duets 
The Top 4 performance will be recorded live on Friday 16 September 2011 at the Mosaïek Teatro in Fairlands, Johannesburg and aired on Sunday 18 September 2011. 
The results show will be aired live on Tuesday 20 September 2011.

Guest Judge: Craig David

Top 3 – Top Threes Terrific Trio 
Every Contastant performed three songs. One of each contestant's songs has been chosen for them based on the year in which they were born.

Sterling EQ accompanied the Idols in two of their three songs.

The Top 3 performance was recorded live on Friday 23 September 2011 at the Mosaïek Teatro in Fairlands, Johannesburg and aired on Sunday 25 September 2011. 
The results show was aired live on Tuesday 27 September 2011.

Guest Judge: HHP

Top 2 – Finale
The Top 2 Contestants performed three songs. Both Dave and Mark were allowed to choose their favourite performance from any stage of the Idols competition. The Top 2 were accompanied by one of SA's biggest bands, The Parlotones. And both of them performed their single.

The Top 2 performance was recorded live on Friday 30 September 2011 at the Mosaïek Teatro in Fairlands, Johannesburg and aired on Sunday 2 October 2011. 
The results show was aired live on Tuesday 4 October 2011.

Guest Judge:

Elimination Chart

References

External links
 Idols website

Season 07
2011 South African television seasons